Elections to Tamworth Borough Council were held on 2 May 2002. The whole council was up for election with boundary changes since the last election in 2000. The Labour Party stayed in overall control of the council.

After the election, the composition of the council was:
Labour 22
Conservative 8

Election result

Ward results

References
2002 Tamworth election result
Ward results

2002
2002 English local elections
2000s in Staffordshire